Sandra Kerr (born 14 February 1942, Plaistow, Essex) is an English folk singer.

Kerr sings and plays English concertina, guitar, Appalachian dulcimer and autoharp. She was a member of The Critics Group from 1963–1972. With John Faulkner, she wrote the music for the TV series Bagpuss and voiced the character of Madeleine Remnant (the rag doll). Kerr has been involved in many programmes for BBC Radio including The Music Box and Listen with Mother.

She has sung with her daughter Nancy Kerr (whose father is Ron Elliott, a Northumbrian piper) and in the groups Sisters Unlimited and Voice Union. Her work has developed to include teaching and leading workshops and she is the director of two folk choirs, Wercasfolk and VoiceMale.  She was on the staff of Newcastle University's music department for 17 years until 2017.

Discography
'A Merry Progress to London' with the Critics Group (Argo ZFB 60 1966)
'Sweet Thames Flow Softly' with the Critics Group (Argo ZDA 47 1966)
'Waterloo-Peterloo' with the Critics Group (Argo ZFB 68 1968)
'The Female Frolic' with the Critics Group (Argo ZDA 82 1968)
'Bagpuss: the Songs & Music' with John Faulkner (Fellside - Smallfolk SMF1 1999)
'Yellow Red and Gold'  (Fellside FECD152)
'My Song is My Own' with Frankie Armstrong, Alison McMorland and Kathy Henderson (Plane Label TPL 0001, 1980) 
'Nuclear Power No Thanks' with Frankie Armstrong, Roy Bailey, Martin Carthy, Ron Elliott, Howard Evans, Chris Foster, John Kirkpatrick, Alison McMorland, Brian Pearson, Geoff Pearson, Leon Rosselson & Roger Williams (Plane Label IMP2 LP, 1981)
'Scalene' with Nancy Kerr & James Fagan  (Fellside FECD137)
'Supermum' children's songs by Sandra Kerr and friends (Pucca Records YOP 05 LP, UK, 1983)
'We Were There' with the Oysterband (Pucca Records YOP 08 LP, UK, 1987)
'No Limits' Sisters Unlimited with Janet Russell, Peta Webb and Rosie Davis (1991 Harbour Town)
'No Bed of Roses' Sisters Unlimited with Janet Russell, Peta Webb and Rosie Davis (Fellside FECD104)
'Neat and Complete' with Nancy Kerr (1996 Fellside FECD107) 
'Guess What They're Selling at the Happiness Counter' with Leon Rosselson (Fuse Records 1992)
'Five Little Frogs' with Nancy Kerr, Leon Rosselson, and Kevin Graal
'Five Little Owls' with Nancy Kerr, Leon Rosselson, and Kevin Graal
'Voice Union' with Evelyne Girardon and Liliana Bertolo (Fellside FECD119)

Books
Kathy Henderson, Frankie Armstrong and Sandra Kerr. My Song is My Own. London: Pluto Press, 1979  &  /  (One hundred traditional and composed women's songs from the British Isles, with select bibliography and discography.)

See also
Political Song Network

References

External links
Newcastle University staff profile
IMDB biography
Folk Music Index

1942 births
Living people
English folk singers
Concertina players
People from Plaistow, Newham
Musicians from London